Downtown Modesto affectionately called "DoMo" by many Modesto residents is the principal administrative area and historic townsite of Modesto, California. Measuring a square-mile, it is bordered by the Needham and Downey Streets to the north, Washington Street to the west, Sierra Drive and Morton Boulevard to the south, and Morton Boulevard and Burney Street to the east. The area has an approximate population of 3,138, and is bisected by the California State Routes 99, 108, and 132.

Early history
In 1870, when the location for Modesto was chosen, a square-mile townsite with streets parallel to the Southern Pacific railroad. The townsite's outer streets were aligned from north, east, west, and south, and its interior streets and alleyways were aligned with the railroad which ran diagonally. They ran from northwest and southeast, and northeast and southwest.

One of the first grand homes to be built in the site was the McHenry Mansion, built in 1883 for Robert McHenry and his wife Matilda Hewitt McHenry. It was styled in the Victorian-Italianate manner, and was designed and built by Stockton architect-contractor Jeremiah Robinson.

By the dawn of the 1900s, early Modesto's streets were paved with asphalt. 

In a so-called "attempt" to revitalize Downtown Modesto in the 1960s, many historic buildings were demolished, and few were spared.

Residential Area
The residential area is south of 5th Street and east of G Street. Many Victorian, Italianate, Craftsman and Mission style homes are proudly mixed with elegant commerces in this lively modern downtown.

References

Modesto
Neighborhoods in Modesto, California